Jamie McNeair (born June 26, 1969) is a retired female heptathlete from the United States, who won the gold medal at the 1995 Pan American Games in Mar del Plata, Argentina. She set her personal best (6374 points) in the heptathlon on 29 July 1995 at a meet in Colorado Springs. She was born in Buffalo, New York.

References

 
 Profile

1969 births
Living people
Track and field athletes from Buffalo, New York
American heptathletes
Athletes (track and field) at the 1995 Pan American Games
Pan American Games gold medalists for the United States
Pan American Games medalists in athletics (track and field)
Medalists at the 1995 Pan American Games
21st-century American women